Vaale is a municipality in the district of Steinburg, in Schleswig-Holstein, Germany.

Sports
The town has a football team, SV Vaalia Vaale, who play in the Kreisklasse A Westküste West. They were in 10th when the 2020–21 season was cancelled. SV Vaalia Vaale II play in the Kreisklasse C Westküste Süd/West 3, in 8th before the cancellation of the season. Some of the Vaalia first team's former players include goalkeeper Jörg Baufeldt, who played for the club until 2006 (when he left for Itzehoer SV), Patrick Krawutschke, the center-back originally from Bruchsal who was transferred from Itzehoer six months after Baufeldt left (he is 34 and could also play defensive midfield), local right-footed striker Mario Awiszus, who left the club at 21 (in 2001), rejoined, and left for Itzehoer in 2008 (he is now a goalkeeping coach at FC Union Tornesch at age 41), and Brunsbüttel-born goalkeeper Christoph Rohweder, who joined in the youth levels from SG Wilstermarsch and left at age 20 (in 2008) for SG Reher/Puls, where he had been playing ever since (his contract expired on 30 June 2021 so he is now a free agent at age 33).

They are the football section of sports club SV Vaalia, and also have a merged team with TSV Wacken.

References

Steinburg